María Celeste Cid (born January 19, 1984) is an Argentine actress.

Biography 
María Celeste Cid was born on January 19, 1984, and grew up in the San Cristóbal neighborhood of the City of  Buenos Aires, Argentina.

Career 
Her acting career began at thirteen when she decided to ask her aunt to take her to a casting for the children's strip Chiquititas. After having gone through Verano del '98, Celeste received the offer for her first protagonist, along with Emanuel Ortega at EnAmorArte. In 2002, she was part of the soap opera Franco Buenaventura, el profe, headed by Osvaldo Laport. There she played a young student who ended up having a relationship with her teacher. In 2003, she played Julia Malaguer Podestá in Resistiré where she shared a leading role with Pablo Echarri. That year she also participated in the "Asesíname" video clip by Charly García. Then, she participated in some episodes of the unitary Pol-ka Locas de amor and in 2005 she returned to the small screen as the protagonist of the unit, Ambiciones, on the Telefe screen. During the course of that year, she performed in classical theater in the Greek tragedy Hipólito and Fedra. Between 2006 and 2007 she dedicated herself to having sporadic television stakes in unitarians such as Mujeres asesinas, Televisión por la identidad and Mujeres elefantes. She debuted as director in the short film Limbo, released in 2008. In 2008, she starred in his first feature film, Motivos para no enamorarse, with Jorge Marrale. Later she returns to the small screen as the protagonist of the mini interactive series Dirigime - La Venganza that was transmitted through the Terra Networks portal. In this fiction the user looks at the chapters according to the character she chooses and at the end of each broadcast he has to vote on the best destination for the story. The series was also broadcast on América TV. In 2009, she starred in Eva & Lola directed by the filmmaker Sabrina Farji. In 2010, she returned to television as one of the protagonists of Para vestir santos for Canal 13 which earned her great success and recognition throughout the year. In that unit she had to sing several times, proving to have a Good voice at the time of singing. In 2011, she had to leave her leading role in the TV Soap Lobo due to illness. Three other actresses vied for the role.

Later she traveled to Europe to star in the dramatic film The German Friend of Argentine-German production. In August 2012, she starred with Luciano Castro on the soap opera Sos mi hombre, broadcast on the screen of Canal 13, which remained on the air until mid-2013. During 2014, Celeste starred in the film Aire Libre, alongside Leonardo Sbaraglia and under the orders of Anahí Berneri. On television he played Vera Santoro in Viudas e hijos del Rock & Roll on the Telefe screen. In 2015, she starred in the film La parte ausente, by Gabriel Maidana, along with Alberto Ajaka. In 2017 she starred in the series Las Estrellas (telenovela) aired on Canal 13 together with Marcela Kloosterboer, Violeta Urtizberea, Natalie Pérez and Justina Bustos. The series premiered on May 29, 2017, and ended on January 23, 2018.

Personal life 
In 2003, she met musician Emmanuel Horvilleur with whom she soon had her first son, André Horvilleur. From 2006 to 2008 she was in a relationship with the Argentine film and television director Luis Ortega. Later in 2013, she had a relationship with the leader of Tan Biónica, Chano Moreno Charpentier, from whom she separated in 2014. In 2015, she was in a relationship with a writer named Leandro Taub. On April 22, 2016, it was announced that she was pregnant with her second baby with actor and television host Michel Noher. On October 13, 2016, her second son was born, whom they called Antón Noher.

Filmography

Television

Movies

Videoclips

Discography 

 1997 — Chiquititas Vol. 3
 1998 — Chiquititas Vol. 4

Awards and nominations

References

External links 
 

1984 births
Actresses from Buenos Aires
21st-century Argentine women singers
Argentine film actresses
Argentine stage actresses
Argentine television actresses
Argentine people of Spanish descent
Living people